Ján Mucha (born 20 June 1978) is a Slovak football goalkeeper who currently plays for 4. liga club FC Slovan Galanta.

Career
Mucha spent four seasons with FC Nitra, appearing in 50 league matches.

References

External links
 
 
 at 1fctatran.sk 
  (2000 Summer Olympics)
  (2000 Summer Olympics)

1978 births
Living people
Sportspeople from Bojnice
Slovak footballers
Slovakia under-21 international footballers
Slovakia youth international footballers
Slovak expatriate footballers
MFK Ružomberok players
ŠK Slovan Bratislava players
FC Nitra players
Czech First League players
FC Viktoria Plzeň players
Atromitos Yeroskipou players
1. FC Tatran Prešov players
TJ Baník Ružiná players
Slovak Super Liga players
Cypriot First Division players
Association football goalkeepers
Expatriate footballers in Cyprus
Slovak expatriate sportspeople in the Czech Republic